Leena Puotiniemi (born 19 March 1976) is a Finnish long-distance runner. She competed in the marathon at the 2012 Summer Olympics, placing 87th with a time of 2:42:01. Puotiniemi won the 2010, 2011 and 2013 Helsinki City Marathon.

References

1976 births
Living people
Finnish female long-distance runners
Olympic athletes of Finland
Athletes (track and field) at the 2012 Summer Olympics
Athletes from Helsinki